Arkansas Railroad Museum is located on Port Road in Pine Bluff, Arkansas at the former Cotton Belt (SSW) yard.

The former SSW shops are occupied by the historic collection of railroad equipment. This museum is about an hour's drive from Little Rock, AR, and is one of the largest displays of historic railroad equipment in Arkansas. The Museum is operated by the Cotton Belt Rail Historical Society and local volunteers. The Museum is open Monday through Saturday from 9 AM to 2 PM and on Sunday afternoon by appointment.

Specific equipment 

Arkansas Railroad Museum is most famous for stabling SSW #819, the last steam locomotive built by the Cotton Belt. The 819 was restored to operation in 1986. It operated on 13 excursions between 1986 and 1993, but is currently out of service pending completion of an overhaul mandated by the Federal Railroad Administration. A collection of historical passenger cars, mostly lightweight Pullman-Standard equipment, is also kept for use behind 819. The 819 is listed on the National Register of Historic Places.

The following equipment is at the museum:

Cotton Belt 336, a D3 Mogul built by Baldwin in 1909, is in poor condition and will be cosmetically restored. This locomotive is also listed on the National Register.

The following cars are part of the St. Louis Southwestern Railway (Cotton Belt Route) Relief Train, also listed on the National Register:
 SSW 96005 a 200 Ton Industrial Brownhoist Steam Relief Crane.
 SSWMW 5682 Boom Car
 SSWMW 98501 Generator Flat Car
 SSWMW 94129 Kitchen Car
 SSWMW 96216 Tool Car
 SSWMW 96209 Crew Sleeper

Other equipment at the museum includes:
Union Pacific 2907 – Alco C-630
Lake Superior and Ishpeming 2300 – GE U23C
Cotton Belt 5006 – EMD GP30
Little Rock and Western #102 (ex L&N #1306) - Alco C420
KLIX #2003 (ex SSW #815) EMD GP20
Rescar GE 25-tonner
West Tennessee #2054 (ex-SP 7012) – ALCO RSD-12
AT&SF 843 – Alco RSD-15
Wabash Alloys GE 25-tonner, listed on the National Register (reference number 07000444)
The tender of SSW 814 sister engine to SSW 819
1942 Tool Car ex-SP Baggage car St. Louis Car Co.
1944 Power Car ex-SP Baggage 6616
G56 Guard Car ACF hospital car from WW2, listed on the National Register (reference number 07000441)
SN87 Jordan Snow Plow U S Army, listed on the National Register (reference number 06001273)
1947 Apple Blossom ex-GN 1121
SSW 2214 – Wood Cupola Caboose
SSW 83 – Bay Window Caboose 
SP 125 – Bay Window Caboose built November 1966
AM 1410 – 60-ft Mechanical Reefer ex-EL
3480 Pegasus Baggage Dorm ex-AT&SF Budd 1938 Transition Car
CBHS 819336 Tank Car

Facility 
The equipment is mostly housed in the former SSW shops, which was the main heavy repair and erection shop for SSW during the steam era. The shop has such heavy repair equipment as pits, massive overhead cranes, and tools for servicing large railroad equipment. On the east side of the former shops is a transfer table that is still operable. The transfer table is used to move exhibits from time to time. The best time to see the exhibits outside is the first weekend in April (unless that weekend is Easter) when the Museum has its annual show. Many of the exhibits are taken outside so that tables can be set up inside the museum for vendors.

References

External links 

 
 Museum information 

 
Buildings and structures in Pine Bluff, Arkansas
Model railway shows and exhibitions
Museums in Jefferson County, Arkansas
National Register of Historic Places in Pine Bluff, Arkansas
Rail infrastructure on the National Register of Historic Places in Arkansas
Railroad museums in Arkansas
Railway locomotives on the National Register of Historic Places in Arkansas
St. Louis Southwestern Railway
Tourist attractions in Pine Bluff, Arkansas